Eleonore Maria Josefa of Austria (21 May 1653 – 17 December 1697) was Queen of Poland and Grand Duchess of Lithuania by marriage to King Michał Korybut Wiśniowiecki, and subsequently Duchess of Lorraine by her second marriage to Charles V, Duke of Lorraine. She acted as nominal regent of the Duchy of Lorraine during the minority of her son between 1690 and 1697.

Life 

Born in Regensburg, Eleonore was the daughter of Holy Roman Emperor Ferdinand III and his wife, Eleonora of Mantua. Not much is known about her childhood. She was given a good education, and could speak both French and Italian.

Queen of Poland 

Eleonore married King Michael Korybut Wiśniowiecki of Poland, also Grand Duke of Lithuania, on 27 February 1670 in the Jasna Góra Monastery.

The marriage was suggested by the Polish envoy Andrzej Olszowski in November 1669 in order ton form an alliance with the Habsburg dynasty through marriage, since the opposition to Michael Korybut Wiśniowiecki were backed by the Pro-French fraction.

The relationship between Eleonore and Michael where described as a harmonious friendship. They had one stillborn son on 29 November 1670. In 1671, she had a miscarriage. The Pro-French opposition of Michael spread rumors that he was homosexual or impotent and that he forced her to fake pregnancies, but this is not considered likely. The Pro-French opposition party under the leadership of John III Sobieski and Mikołaj Prażmowski attempted to convince her to divorce, but she refused and instead demonstrated loyalty toward the king.

Queen Eleonore was regarded as an ideal model of a good, supportive and loyal spouse. She learned Polish, although she preferred Latin, and accompanied Michael on his official journeys around Poland. She was guided in her role as queen by her lady-in-waiting Klara Izabella Pacowa, who became her influential favorite.

The conflict between the supporters of king Michael and the opposition party resulted in such a conflict that there was a fear of civil war in Poland. In February 1672, the queen was asked to act as a mediator between king Michael and the opposition leader John III Sobieski during the 1672 Sejm. She accepted the assignment and enterred negotiations assisted by the Papal nuntie Franciszek Buonvisim, the Bishop of Kraków, Andrzej Trzebicki, and the voivod of Vitebsk Jan Antonii Chrapowicki. Eleonore succeeded in convincing the opposition to acknowledge the election victory of king Michael in exchange for amnesty for the opposition.

King Michael died on 10 November 1673. She remained in Poland for a couple of years after his death.

Duchess of Lorraine 

Eleonore initially stayed in Poland in her dowager seat at Toruń. It was suggested by the Habsburgs that she marry Charles V of Lorraine, who was then to be elected king of Poland as the Habsburg candidate, benefitted by the popularity Eleonore enjoyed in Poland. Instead, however, the French opposition party won the election of 1674 under the leadership of John III Sobieski. In the spring of 1675, Eleonore departed Poland for Vienna.

Eleonore married Charles V of Lorraine on 4 February 1678 in Wiener Neustadt, Austria. Since the Duchy of Lorraine was under French occupation, the couple resided in Innsbrück, in Austria. They were the parents of six children. She passed to her heirs the inheritance of the Gonzagas of Mantua.

When she married Charles, there were fears in Poland that she was planning to overthrow king John III Sobieski and install her own spouse as king.  Eleonora did keep in contact with Pro-Habsburg Polish magnates such as Dymitr Wiśniowiecki, Kalisz Voivode and Jan Opaliński, but no such plan was ever realised.  When John III Sobieski died in 1696, however, she supported her son Leopold's candidacy to the Polish throne, though he lost the election.

When she was widowed in 1690, the title Duke of Lorraine and the right to the Duchy of Lorraine was inherited by her eldest son Leopold. Since Leopold was eleven years old, Eleonore became nominal regent during his minority. As his regent, she worked to end the French occupation of Lorraine and restore the Duchy's independence. Her goal was reached when the Duchy of Lorraine was restored at the Peace of Ryswick in 1697. She died not long after.

Eleonore died at the age of 44, having outlived both of her husbands and two of her children.

Issue 
 Leopold, Duke of Lorraine (1679–1729)
 Charles Joseph of Lorraine (1680–1715)
 Eleanor of Lorraine (1682)
 Charles Ferdinand of Lorraine (1683–1685)
 Joseph Innocent Emanuel of Lorraine (1685–1705)
 Francis Anton Joseph of Lorraine (1689–1715)

Ancestry

See also 
 Częstochowa

References

Sources

1653 births
1697 deaths
Polish queens consort
Grand Duchesses of Lithuania
Prussian royal consorts
17th-century House of Habsburg
17th-century women of the Holy Roman Empire
Burials at the Imperial Crypt
Austrian princesses
House of Lorraine
Regents of Lorraine
Remarried royal consorts
People from Regensburg
Duchesses of Lorraine
Polish Roman Catholics
Daughters of emperors
Children of Ferdinand III, Holy Roman Emperor
Daughters of kings